The 2014 Campeonato Paulista de Futebol Profissional da Primeira Divisão - Série A1 (officially the 2014 Paulistão Chevrolet for sponsorship reasons) was the 113th season of São Paulo's top professional football league.

Format
In the first stage the twenty teams are drawn, with seeding, into four groups of five teams each, with each team playing once against the fifteen clubs from the other three groups. After each team has played fifteen matches, the top two teams of each group qualify for the quarter-final stage.
After the completion of the first stage, the four clubs with the lowest number of points, regardless of the group, will be relegated to the Campeonato Paulista Série A2.
If all four clubs with the lowest number of points are from the same group, the best third-placed club from the other groups will qualify for the quarter-final stage.

Tiebreakers
The teams are ranked according to points (3 points for a win, 1 point for a draw, 0 points for a loss). If two or more teams are equal on points on completion of the group matches, the following criteria are applied to determine the rankings:
Higher number of points obtained;
Superior goal difference;
Higher number of goals scored;
Fewest red cards received;
Fewest yellow cards received;
Draw in the headquarters of the FPF.

Teams

Source: Futebol Paulista

First stage

Group A

Group B

Group C

Group D

Knockout stage

Bracket

Final standings

Awards

Team of the year

Player of the Season
The Player of the Year was awarded to Cícero Santos.

Young Player of the Season
The Young Player of the Year was awarded to Geuvânio.

Countryside Best Player of the Season
The Countryside Best Player of the Year was awarded to Léo Costa.

Top scorer of the Season
The top scorer of the season – TBD.

References

Campeonato Paulista seasons
Paulista